Jean-Marie Brochu (1926 – 22 August 2020) was a Canadian Catholic priest in the Archdiocese of Quebec.

Biography
Brochu was born in 1926 in Quebec City as the oldest of five children to Raoul Brochu and Yvonne Cormier. He studied at the Collège de Sainte-Anne-de-la-Pocatière, Université Laval, and the Grand Séminaire de Québec. Ordained a priest in 1952, he spent 20 years as secretary to the Archbishop of Quebec, Maurice Roy. He then became rector at the Saint-Charles Garnier parish in Sillery. From 1963 to the 2010s, Father Brochu had his own radio show, where he was called Monsieur le Bonheur.

Brochu founded an organization called Le Noël du Bonheur. The mission was to visit patients who were chronically hospitalized. More than 8200 patients were visited in 98 residences in Capitale-Nationale and Chaudière-Appalaches. Approximately 2500 volunteers were involved, and three gifts per year were given to each patient.

On 10 December 1998, Brochu was awarded the Sovereign's Medal for Volunteers. He was then inducted into the Order of Canada on 30 October 2003 by Adrienne Clarkson. On 29 November 2011, MP of Vanier Patrick Huot awarded Vanier with the Medal of the National Assembly of Quebec in the presence of Premier Jean Charest.

Jean-Marie Brochu died on 22 August 2020.

References

1926 births
2020 deaths
20th-century Canadian Roman Catholic priests
French Quebecers
Clergy from Quebec
People from Quebec City
21st-century Canadian Roman Catholic priests